Paranoia Mandatory Bonus Fun! Card Game is a 2005 card game published by Mongoose Publishing.

Gameplay
Paranoia Mandatory Bonus Fun! Card Game is a game in which the object is to be the highest-ranking Troubleshooter when any player loses their sixth clone.

Reception
The game was reviewed in the online second volume of Pyramid.

Paranoia Mandatory Bonus Fun! Card Game won the 2005 Origins Award as Gamer's Choice Best Traditional Card Game of the Year.

References

Card games introduced in 2005
Mongoose Publishing games
Origins Award winners
Paranoia (role-playing game)